Homaea is a genus of moths of the family Noctuidae. The genus was erected by Achille Guenée in 1852.

Species in Africa
Homaea addisonae Hampson, 1914
Homaea clathrum Guenée, 1852
Homaea striatalis Hampson, 1918

References

Catocalinae
Moth genera